Otway McLaurin Falkiner (19 April 1909 – 22 March 2000) was an Australian politician.

He was born in Melbourne to grazier Otway Rothwell Falkiner and Mary Elizabeth McLaurin. He attended Geelong Grammar School and became a grazier. On 11 October 1934 he married Agnes Cullen; they had four children but were divorced in 1977. He served in the New South Wales Legislative Council from 1946 to 1978, representing the Country Party. Falkiner died in Sydney in 2000.

References

1909 births
2000 deaths
National Party of Australia members of the Parliament of New South Wales
Members of the New South Wales Legislative Council
20th-century Australian politicians
People educated at Geelong Grammar School